Mellu-e Olya (also Romanized as Mellū-e ‘Olyā; also known as Mellū-e Bālā, Mallow, and Mallū) is a village in Zam Rural District, Pain Jam District, Torbat-e Jam County, Razavi Khorasan Province, Iran. At the 2006 census, its population was 310, in 62 families.

References 

Populated places in Torbat-e Jam County